Aeroméxico Flight 229 was a McDonnell Douglas DC-9 that crashed into the side of a mountain while on approach to Licenciado Gustavo Díaz Ordaz International Airport in Puerto Vallarta, Mexico, on 20 June 1973. There were no survivors among the 27 passengers and crew.

Accident
The accident aircraft was on a passenger flight from Houston-Intercontinental Airport (now George Bush Intercontinental Airport) in Houston, Texas to Mexico City International Airport via General Mariano Escobedo International Airport in Monterrey, Mexico, and Licenciado Gustavo Díaz Ordaz International Airport in Puerto Vallarta. The aircraft was nearing Licenciado Gustavo Díaz Ordaz when the flight was cleared for approach and landing on runway 04. At 22:47, during the approach, the aircraft flew into the side of Las Minas Mountain,  SSE of the Puerto Vallarta airport. The aircraft broke up and caught fire, killing all 27 passengers and crew. Alejandro Rojano was the Air Traffic Controller, reported missing aircraft at 22:50 PM to the main offices of RAMSA in Mexico City. After complete investigation was indicated that the pilot did not reduce the velocity of the aircraft doing the descending pattern.

See also
Prinair Flight 277
CFIT

References

External links 
 

229
Aviation accidents and incidents in 1973
Aviation accidents and incidents in Mexico
Accidents and incidents involving the McDonnell Douglas DC-9
Airliner accidents and incidents involving controlled flight into terrain
1973 in Mexico
June 1973 events in Mexico